Rachael Atlanta Stirling (born 30 May 1977) is an English stage, film and television actress. She has been nominated twice for the Laurence Olivier Award for her stage work. She played Nancy Astley in the BBC drama Tipping the Velvet, and Millie in the ITV series The Bletchley Circle. She has also guest starred in Lewis and one episode of Doctor Who, co-starring with her mother Diana Rigg.

Early life and education
Stirling was born in St Marylebone, London, England and is the daughter of actress Diana Rigg and theatre producer Archibald Stirling, Laird of Keir. Her parents married in 1982 and divorced in 1990. 

Stirling attended Wycombe Abbey School. She graduated with a BA in art history from the University of Edinburgh, where she performed with the Edinburgh University Theatre Company.

Theatre
Stirling made her first major appearance on stage in 1997 as Desdemona in the National Youth Theatre revival of Othello at the Arts Theatre opposite Chiwetel Ejiofor in the title role. A year later, again at the Arts Theatre with the NYT, she played Olive in the female version of The Odd Couple; while in 1998, portraying Kate in Dancing at Lughnasa for NYT at the Arts. She next appeared in a variety of roles in plays such as Dusty Hughes' Helpless (Donmar Warehouse, 2000); A Woman of No Importance (Theatre Royal Haymarket, 2003); Anna in the Tropics (Hampstead Theatre, 2004); and Tamburlaine (Bristol Old Vic and Barbican, 2005), and she followed in her mother's footsteps as Lionheart's daughter in the National Theatre stage version of Theatre of Blood (2005). In 2006, for the Peter Hall Company at the Theatre Royal, Bath, she played Helena in Peter Gill's revival of Look Back in Anger, while in 2007 at Wilton's Music Hall in London, she starred as Yelena in David Mamet's version of Uncle Vanya, and as Katharina in The Taming of the Shrew.

Stirling starred onstage in The Priory directed by Jeremy Herrin at the Royal Court Theatre in 2009. Her role as Rebecca earned her a nomination for Laurence Olivier Award for Best Performance in a Supporting Role. In 2010 she appeared as Helena in Peter Hall's production of A Midsummer Night's Dream at the Rose Theatre, Kingston. Stirling starred as Lady Chiltern in a 2010 production of An Ideal Husband at the Vaudeville Theatre, for which she received her second nomination for a Laurence Olivier Award. From February to April 2012, she appeared as Sylvia alongside Mark Gatiss, Tobias Menzies, and Nancy Carroll in The Recruiting Officer, the production at the Donmar Warehouse directed by newly appointed artistic director Josie Rourke.

Film
Stirling's first screen appearance was in the 1998 British comedy film Still Crazy.

Other film appearances include Maybe Baby, Redemption Road (2001), Complicity (with her Tipping the Velvet co-star Keeley Hawes), Another Life (with Vanity Fair actress Natasha Little), The Triumph of Love (with Mira Sorvino), as Mary Jones in Salmon Fishing in the Yemen, and as Anna in Snow White and the Huntsman.

Television
Stirling's first break in television was in the 2000 NBC miniseries In the Beginning, which was adapted from Genesis. Stirling played the young Rebeccah, with her mother, Diana Rigg, as the older Rebeccah. Her next notable role was Nan Astley in the 2002 BBC drama series Tipping the Velvet.

In 2003, she appeared as Caroline Crale in Agatha Christie's Poirot episode "Five Little Pigs".

In 2011, Stirling starred in the BBC Four adaptation of D.H. Lawrence's Women in Love as Ursula Brangwen. She portrayed Millie in both series of the ITV mystery drama The Bletchley Circle in 2012 and 2014, and reprised the role in The Bletchley Circle: San Francisco (2018).

Stirling appeared in a 2013 episode of Doctor Who titled "The Crimson Horror" alongside her mother. The episode had been specially written for Stirling and her mother by Mark Gatiss (marking the very first appearance of the two actresses together professionally) and was aired on 4 May 2013 as part of Series 7.

In 2014, Stirling portrayed Kate Wilkinson in the Cold War spy thriller television series The Game, and appeared in the BBC Four comedy drama Detectorists as Becky, initially girlfriend, then wife, of Andy (played by Mackenzie Crook), also featuring alongside her mother, Diana Rigg, who played Becky's mother.

Stirling appeared as a guest on the BBC1 cookery programme Saturday Kitchen Live which was broadcast on 1 March 2014.

In 2015, Stirling played the part of Arabella Yount, the spendthrift wife of a banker, in the three-part BBCs series Capital based on John Lanchester's novel of the same name.

In December 2016, Stirling appeared on University Challenge at Christmas as part of a team made up of notable alumni of the University of Edinburgh.

In 2021, she starred in the ITV television drama series Hollington Drive.

Other work
Stirling is an occasional interviewer on the BBC Radio 4 chat show Loose Ends, and presented the station's programme Stage Door in December 2012. She also wrote a restaurant column for Diplomat magazine.

Stirling took part in Occupy London's reading of Dickens' A Christmas Carol on the steps of St Paul's Cathedral, London in December 2011.

In 2014, Stirling appeared as a guest on BBC Radio 4's Midweek with Libby Purves, Roger Bannister and Kevin Warwick.

Personal life 
Stirling can speak Russian and is experienced in horse riding and jumping. Until 2012, she was engaged to actor Oliver Chris, whom she had been dating since 2007. Stirling married musician and Elbow frontman Guy Garvey on 3 June 2016. They have one son, born in April 2017.

Filmography

References

External links
 

Living people
1977 births
20th-century English actresses
21st-century English actresses
Actresses from London
Alumni of the University of Edinburgh
British people of English descent
British people of Scottish descent
English film actresses
English radio people
English stage actresses
English television actresses
National Youth Theatre members
People educated at Wycombe Abbey